A safety net is a net to protect people from injury after falling from heights by limiting the distance they fall, and deflecting to dissipate the impact energy.  The term also refers to devices for arresting falling or flying objects for the safety of people beyond or below the net.
Safety nets are used in construction, building maintenance, entertainment, or other industries.

Action of a safety net

A safety net gives falling objects much more time to come to rest than hitting hard ground directly. In physical terms, this means more time for deceleration and kinetic energy transfer, resulting in a softer landing and much lower risk of damage.

What kind of net to be used, depends upon many factors, (such as the factors that could determine force of the impact) such as falling objects's speed and mass.  To encounter more force, a more total width of the net, is required. The minimum distance of the spot on net at which object impacted, and the edge of net (nearest edge), matters, and to be kept more than certain limit. There is role of materials used to make the ropes of net (such as an iron rod grid will not work as good as flexible and extensible ropes), and the tension or stretch used to make the net (stored in the ropes), also have  some roles.  The net is to be set at an appropriate height from the hard ground, so that the object, along with the rope, does not clash with the hard ground. The mesh hole size should not be so big that falling object/people/part of it could pass through the holes.

Construction safety net 

Construction Safety nets are used at high-rise building construction sites for preventing accidental fall of people or objects from the site. Construction safety nets are the safest and cost effective fall prevention system in the world. Construction safety nets are flexible plastic nets made from HDPE or High-density polyethylene raw materials. Construction safety netting system is also known as debris netting which can be installed both horizontally or vertically according to the requirements. The best practice of construction netting is to wrap up the whole construction site from bottom to top, which works as a protection wall to prevent anything from falling without blocking the view. Safety net installation at any building site requires professional expertise and technical knowledge.

Uses
Escape from a building during a disaster (including fire), construction-work, action-sports, etc.

See also
 Construction site safety
 Fall arrest harness
 Roof edge protection
 Shock absorber
 Buffer (disambiguation)
 Buffer stop
 Buffer (rail transport)
 Damping ratio
 Damper (disambiguation)
 Damped wave
 Cushioning
 Shock (mechanics)
 Impact (mechanics)
 Jerk (physics)
 Impulse (physics) 
 Collision
 Brake
 Terminal velocity

References

External links
 Safety Net Systems // Occupational Safety & Health Administration
 Safety nets: Fall protection for the construction industry  / National Safety Council Data Sheet 608, February 2006
 Fall Protection in Construction, OSHA3146 / U.S. Department of Labor Occupational Safety and Health Administration, 1998, page 6 "Fall Protection Systems Criteria and Practices", page 12 "Safety Net Systems"
 Guide to Fall Protection Regulations, Workers Compensation Board, Canada, June 2013, page 11
 A technical guide to the selection and use of fall prevention and arrest equipment  / Glasgow Caledonian University for the Health and Safety Executive 2005 - "7.0 FALL ARREST NETTING (SAFETY NETS)" pp 107–138

Protective barriers
Nets (devices)